Paul Shields is the name of:

 Paul Shields (American football) (born 1976), American football player
 Paul Shields (footballer) (born 1981), Scottish footballer
 Paul Shields (rugby union) (born 1978), Irish rugby union footballer
 Paul Shields (actor), actor in the film Lansdown